Speak, Brother, Speak! is a live album by American jazz drummer Max Roach featuring performances recorded in San Francisco in 1962 and released by the Fantasy label.

Reception

Allmusic awarded the album 3 stars stating: "The music is somewhere between hard bop and the avant-garde, and the musicians really push each other, although the results are not quite essential. Clifford Jordan fans in particular will find this to be an interesting set".

Track listing
All compositions by Max Roach except as indicated
 "Speak, Brother, Speak" (Clifford Jordan, Eddie Khan, Max Roach, Mal Waldron) - 25:03   
 "A Variation" - 20:30

Personnel 
Max Roach - drums
Clifford Jordan  - tenor saxophone
Mal Waldron - piano
Eddie Khan - bass

References 

1963 live albums
Max Roach live albums
Fantasy Records live albums